Science in science fiction is the study or analysis of how science is portrayed in works of science fiction, including novels, stories, and films.  It covers a large range of topics, since science takes on many roles in science fiction.  Hard science fiction is based on engineering or the "hard" sciences (for example, physics, astronomy, or chemistry), whereas soft science fiction is based on the "soft" sciences, and especially the social sciences (anthropology, sociology, psychology, political science, and so on).  

Likewise, the accuracy of the science portrayed spans a wide range - sometimes it is an extrapolation of existing technology, sometimes it is a realistic or plausible portrayal  of a technology that does not exist, but which is plausible from a scientific perspective; and sometimes it is simply a plot device that looks scientific, but has no basis in science. Examples are:
Realistic case:  In 1944, the science fiction story Deadline by Cleve Cartmill depicted the atomic bomb.  This technology was real, unknown to the author.
Extrapolation:  Arthur C. Clarke wrote about space elevators, basically a long cable extending from the Earth's surface to geosynchronous orbit.  While we cannot build one today, it violates no physical principles.
Plot device:  The classic example of an unsupported plot device is faster-than-light drive, often called a "warp drive".  It is unsupported by physics as we know it, but needed for galaxy-wide plots with human lifespans.

Criticism and commentary on how science is portrayed in science fiction is done by academics from science, literature, film studies, and other disciplines; by literary critics and film critics; and by science fiction writers and sci fi fans and bloggers.

Hard science in science fiction 

 Planets in science fiction
 Time travel in science fiction
 Weapons in science fiction
 Materials science in science fiction
 Genetics in fiction

Social science in science fiction 

Sex and sexuality in speculative fiction
Religious ideas in science fiction
Women in science fiction
Gender in speculative fiction
Reproduction and pregnancy in speculative fiction
Political ideas in science fiction
World government in science fiction

See also 
Category Physics in fiction
Physics and Star Wars

References

Bibliography
The Science in Science Fiction by Brian Stableford, David Langford, & Peter Nicholls (1982)
 Science Fiction with Good Astronomy & Physics

Science in fiction by theme
Science fiction themes